Paulo Ricardo Campos Silvino (27 July 1939 – 17 August 2017) was a Brazilian comedian, composer and actor.

Biography
Silvino worked for 52 years on television Rede Globo and Sistema Brasileiro de Televisão (SBT).

He also worked in soap operas and in the cinema, in the film Muita Calma Nessa Hora 2. In 1988, he presented the TV program "Cassino do Chacrinha" until the death of the presenter, Chacrinha.

Silvino died of stomach cancer in Rio de Janeiro on August 17, 2017, aged 78.

Filmography

Film
 Sherlock de Araque (1957)
 Minha Sogra É da Polícia (1958)
 O Rei da Pilantragem (1968)
 Com a Cama na Cabeça (1972)
 Um Edifício Chamado 200 (1973)
 Muita Calma Nessa Hora 2 (2014)
 Até que a Sorte nos Separe 3: A Falência Final (2015) - Padre Elias
 Gostosas, Lindas e Sexies (2017) - Gilson (final film role)

TV shows

At Globo TV
 Balança Mas Não Cai (pt) (1968)
 Faça Humor, Não Faça Guerra (pt) (1970)
 Planeta dos Homens (pt) (1976)
 Viva o Gordo (pt) (1981)
 Zorra Total (2006-2016) - Severino

At SBT TV
 A Praça É Nossa (1987) - Homem do Açucareiro (1989-1992)

References 

1939 births
2017 deaths
People from Rio de Janeiro (city)
Brazilian male comedians
Deaths from stomach cancer
Deaths from cancer in Rio de Janeiro (state)